Horton House (also known as Horton-duBignon House, Brewery Ruins, duBignon Cemetery) is a historic site on Riverview Drive in Jekyll Island, Georgia.

The tabby house was originally constructed in 1743 by Major William Horton, a top military aide to General James Oglethorpe. Horton also brewed beer in Georgia's first brewery (the ruins of which are a few hundred yards down the road). This structure has been meticulously preserved over the past 100 years as an example of coastal Georgia building techniques and as one of the oldest surviving buildings in the state.

Across the street from the Horton House ruins is the du Bignon cemetery, a tabby wall surrounding the graves of five people: Ann Amelia du Bignon, Joseph du Bignon, Marie Felicite Riffault, Hector deLiyannis, and George Harvey. Horton House, the Brewery Ruins, and the cemetery were added to the National Register of Historic Places in 1971.

Gallery

See also
List of the oldest buildings in Georgia

References

External links
NPS website
Major William Horton historical marker
 

Houses completed in 1743
Houses on the National Register of Historic Places in Georgia (U.S. state)
Houses in Glynn County, Georgia
Tabby buildings
Tourist attractions in Glynn County, Georgia
Historic districts on the National Register of Historic Places in Georgia (U.S. state)
National Register of Historic Places in Glynn County, Georgia
1743 establishments in the Thirteen Colonies
Jekyll Island
Ruins in the United States